The Arlington County Police Department (ACPD) is the municipal law enforcement agency servicing the 238,643 residents of the  of jurisdiction within Arlington County, Virginia. It is the primary law enforcement agency in the county for all levels of law enforcement, although the many federal reservations, enclaves and special jurisdictions in the county often maintain their own law enforcement agencies, which often collaborate with the County Police on many of their larger issues.

History

The ACPD was created on February 1, 1940, as the Arlington County Division of Police with Harry Woodyard as the first Chief of Police. A few years later, the first ACPD auxiliary force was created.

In 1960, Arlington County Police arrested people for violating Virginia's segregation and anti-miscegenation laws.

On October 1, 1963 after a departmental reorganization, the agency assumed its present name.

In September 2001, the Arlington County P.D. responded to the Pentagon after terrorists attacked it during the September 11 attacks, as the building is located in the county.

Since the establishment of the Arlington County Police Department, 7 officers have died in the line of duty, the most recent in 2016 as a result of an illness caused by the September 11 attacks of 2001.

In June 2020, Arlington County withdrew its personnel from the District of Columbia after Arlington County Police Department officers were involved in an incident in which protesters were forcefully cleared from Lafayette Park. An Arlington County Police Department captain was later named in a federal lawsuit related to the incident.

In September 2020, Charles "Andy" Penn became Acting Chief of Police following the retirement of former Chief of Police Murray Jay Farr. On June 4, 2021, Penn was appointed to be the permanent Chief of Police by Arlington County Manager Mark Schwartz. Farr had served as Chief of Police since 2015.

Gallery

See also

 List of law enforcement agencies in Virginia
 Arlington County Sheriff's Office

References

External links

Arlington County Police Department official weblink
Arlington County Sheriff's Office official weblink
Arlington County government official website

Arlington County, Virginia
County police departments of Virginia
1940 establishments in Virginia
Government agencies established in 1940